Inkerman is a census-designated place (CDP) in Jenkins Township, Luzerne County, Pennsylvania, United States. The population was 1,819 at the 2010 census.

Geography

It is located in the western portion of Jenkins Township. The CDP is situated northeast of Plains Township, northwest of Laflin, south of Pittston, and southeast of the Susquehanna River.

Demographics

References

Census-designated places in Luzerne County, Pennsylvania
Census-designated places in Pennsylvania